Manolom Phomsouvanh (born in September 26, 1992) is a Laotian footballer who playing for Loei City in Thai Regional League Division 2. He is the member of Laotian national team, played at the 2014 FIFA World Cup qualification.

External links

 

1992 births
Living people
Laotian footballers
Laos international footballers
Laotian expatriate footballers
Laotian expatriate sportspeople in Thailand
Expatriate footballers in Thailand
Association football midfielders